Hovelange is a small town in the commune of Beckerich, in western Luxembourg.  , the town has a population of 285, with a latitude of 49,7225 and a longitude of 5,9072.

References

Beckerich
Towns in Luxembourg